President Kennedy School is a coeducational secondary school and sixth form with academy status, located in the Keresley area of Coventry, England. The predecessor school President Kennedy School and 
Community College was judged outstanding by Ofsted in September 2013.

History 
The school was founded in 1966 with Dr J. M. Frost the first headmaster. It was originally to be called either Rookery Farm School or Holbrook High, but the assassination of U.S. President John F Kennedy during the approval stage resulted in the school being named after President John F. Kennedy. The school marked the 50th anniversary of John F. Kennedy's assassination with a series of special assemblies and debates led by its History Department. The school is located in the north-west of Coventry and includes the Holbrooks and Whitmore Park areas of the city.

References

External links
 President Kennedy School
 Coventry City Council

Secondary schools in Coventry
Educational institutions established in 1966
1966 establishments in England
Academies in Coventry